Just A Way (Japanese ジャスタウェイ, foaled 8 March 2009) is a Japanese Thoroughbred racehorse. After showing useful, but unexceptional form in his early career he emerged as a major talent with a win in the 2013 Autumn edition of the Tenno Sho. In March 2014 he ran outside Japan for the first time and won the Dubai Duty Free by more than six lengths. By April 2014 he was the top-rated horse in the world and retained his position throughout the year.

Background
Just A Way is a bay horse with a white star and white socks on his hind legs bred in Hokkaido by the Shadai Corporation. He was from the second crop of foals sired by Heart's Cry a horse whose wins included the Arima Kinen and the Dubai Sheema Classic. His dam, Sibyl was a Japanese-bred daughter of the Breeders' Cup Classic winner Wild Again and the CCA Oaks winner Charon. As a descendant of the broodmare Venturesome, Charon was distantly related to several major winners including Silver Patriarch, Touch Gold, Discreet Cat, With Approval and Izvestia.

In July 2010, the yearling was consigned by the Shiraoi Farm to the JRHA Select Sale and was bought for 12 million yen by Akatsuki Yamatoya. The name came from that of a toy in episode 32 of the anime series Gintama, the script for which was written by Yamatoya and would later be used for a spear used by a monster in episode 37 of the tokusatsu series Ressha Sentai ToQger, which Yamatoya also wrote that episode.

Racing career

2011: two-year-old season
Just A Way made a successful debut on 23 July 2011 when he won a maiden race over 1600 metres at Niigata Racecourse. He was moved up to Grade 3 level at the same course in September and finished second when 7/10 favourite for the Niigata Nisai Stakes. On his final appearance of the season he finished fourth behind Deep Brillante in the Tokyo Sports Hai Nisai Stakes Grade 3 at Tokyo Racecourse in November.

2012: three-year-old season
In February 2012, Just A Way finished fourth in the Grade 3 Kisaragi Sho and then recorded his first important success when winning the Grade 3 Arlington Cup over one mile at Hanshin Racecourse. He was then moved up to Grade 1 class in May and finished unplaced in both the NHK Mile Cup and the Japanese Derby. After a break of four months, Just A Way returned in autumn to finish second in the Grade 2 Mainichi Okan and sixth in the Tenno Sho.

2013: four-year-old season
Just A Way was beaten in his first five races, competing in Grade 2 and Grade 3 races. He finished third in the Nikkan Sports Sho and second in the Epsom Cup, Sekiya Kinen and Mainichi Okan. On 27 October, Just A Way started at odds of 14.5/1 for the Grade 1 Tenno Sho over ten furlongs at Tokyo. The Japanese Horse of the Year Gentildonna started favourite for the race ahead of Tokei Halo and Eishin Flash who had won the race in the previous year. Ridden by Yuichi Fukunaga, Just A Way was not among the early leaders but began to make progress with a quarter of a mile left to run. He took the lead a furlong from the finish and drew clear in the closing stages to win by four lengths from Gentildonna in "impressive" style. After the race Fukunaga said: "In his previous race I felt he was getting stronger, so I expected his success today."

2014: five-year-old season
Just A Way began his fourth season in the Nakayama Kinen on 3 March and won by three and a half lengths from Archimedes. He was then sent to Dubai where he started 3/1 favourite for the Dubai Duty Free over nine furlongs at Meydan Racecourse. His opponents included the British mares The Fugue and Dank as well as runners from South Africa, France, Dubai and Hong Kong. He was restrained towards the rear of the field by Fukunaga before moving forward in the straight. He took the lead a furlong and a half from the finish and accelerated clear to win by six and a quarter lengths from the South African horse Vercingetorix with Dank in third place. Fukunaga commented: "That was amazing. The start didn't go as I hoped it would and I had to change my plan but it all worked out for me".

On his return to Japan, Just A Way was moved back in distance for the Yasuda Kinen over 1600 metres at Tokyo on 8 June. Despite doubts about his ability to cope with the soft turf he was made 7/10 favourite against sixteen opponents, with Yoshitomi Shibata taking over from the suspended Fukunaga. He looked likely to be beaten in the straight as the 147/1 outsider Grand Prix Boss established a clear lead, but produced a strong finish to take the lead in the last stride and win by a nose.

In autumn, Just A Way was one of three Japanese horses, the others being Gold Ship and Harp Star, sent to Europe to contest the 93rd running of the Prix de l'Arc de Triomphe at Longchamp Racecourse. Racing over a distance of 2400 metres for the first time for more than two and a half years, he started the 8/1 fifth choice in the betting behind Taghrooda, Avenir Certain, Ectot and Harp Star. He raced in mid-division before making some progress in the straight but never looked likely to win and finished eighth of the twenty runners, five lengths behind the winner Treve. On his return to Japan, Just A Way continued to compete over longer distances and started third favourite behind Gentildonna and Harp Star for the Japan Cup on 30 October. He finished second of the eighteen runners, four lengths behind the winner Epiphaneia. On his final racecourse appearance, Just A Way was stepped up in distance again for the Arima Kinen over 2500 metres on 28 December and started third favourite behind Gold Ship and Epiphaneia. After being held up at the back of the field by Fukunaga he made progress on the outside in the straight but was unable to reach the leaders and finished fourth behind Gentildonna, To The World and Gold Ship.

Assessment and awards
In the April edition of the World's Best Racehorse Rankings Just A Way was placed first, five pounds ahead of Game On Dude. His rating of 130 was the highest achieved so early in the year since Curlin in 2008.

In the polling for the 2014 JRA Award Just A Way was elected Best Older Male Horse, taking 242 of the 285 votes beating Epiphaneia (31 votes) and Gold Ship (11 votes). He also finished runner-up to Gentildonna in the Japanese Horse of the Year poll and third to Snow Dragon in voting for the JRA Award for Best Sprinter or Miler.

When the 2014 World's Best Racehorse Rankings were published in January 2015, Just A Way was rated the best horse to race anywhere in the world in 2014, one pound ahead of Epiphaneia and two ahead of Able Friend, Australia, Kingman, The Grey Gatsby and Variety Club.

Pedigree

See also
 List of historical horses

References

2009 racehorse births
Racehorses bred in Japan
Racehorses trained in Japan
Thoroughbred family 2-n